Francis Hime (Rio de Janeiro, August 31, 1939) is a Brazilian composer, arranger, pianist and singer. He is the composer of the jazz standard Minha / All Mine, recorded, among others, by Bill Evans, Tony Bennett and Eliane Elias.

Discography 
 1964 – Os Seis em Ponto
 1973 – Francis Hime
 1977 – Passaredo
 1978 – Se Porém Fosse Portanto
 1980 – Francis
 1981 – Os Quatro Mineiros
 1981 – Sonho de Moço
 1982 – Pau Brasil
 1985 – Clareando
 2000 – Sinfonia do Rio de Janeiro de São Sebastião
 2001 – Meus Caros Pianistas
 2001 – Sinfonia do Rio de Janeiro de São Sebastião – DVD
 2002 – Choro Rasgado
 2003 – Brasil Lua Cheia
 2003 – Brasil Lua Cheia – DVD
 2004 – Álbum Musical
 2005 – Essas Parcerias
 2006 – Arquitetura da Flor
 2007 – Francis Ao Vivo
 2007 – CHORO – DVD

References

External links 
 

1939 births
Living people
Bossa nova pianists
Brazilian pianists
20th-century Brazilian male singers
20th-century Brazilian singers
Musicians from Rio de Janeiro (city)
Samba musicians
Male pianists
21st-century pianists
21st-century Brazilian male singers
21st-century Brazilian singers
Male jazz musicians